The 2010 World Men's Curling Championship (branded as the Capital One World Men's Curling Championship 2010 for sponsorship reasons) was held from April 3–11, 2010 at the Stadio Olimpico Del Ghiaccio in Cortina d'Ampezzo, Italy.

Qualification
 (Host country)
 (Defending champions)
 (Top Americas finisher from the 2009 World Championship)
 (Pacific champion) 
 (Pacific runner-up)
Six teams from the 2009 European Championship:
 
 
 
 
 
 
American berth from the 2010 USA-Brazil Challenge

Teams

* Thomas Ulsrud withdrew before the start of competition due to an illness in the family.

Round-robin standings
Final round-robin standings

Round-robin results 
All draw times listed are in Central European Time

Draw 1
Saturday, April 3, 14:00

Draw 2
Saturday, April 3, 19:00

Draw 3
Sunday, April 4th, 9:00

Draw 4
Sunday, April 4th, 14:00

Draw 5
Sunday, April 4th, 19:00

Draw 6
Monday, April 5th, 8:00

Draw 7
Monday, April 5th, 13:00

Draw 8
Monday, April 5th, 18:00

Draw 9
Tuesday, April 6th, 10:00

Draw 10
Tuesday, April 6th, 15:00

Draw 11
Tuesday, April 6th, 20:00

Draw 12
Wednesday, April 7th, 10:00

Draw 13
Wednesday, April 7th, 15:00

Draw 14
Wednesday, April 7th, 20:00

Draw 15
Thursday, April 8th, 10:00

Draw 16
Thursday, April 8th, 15:00

Draw 17
Thursday, April 8th, 20:00

Playoffs

1 vs. 2
Friday, April 9, 19:00

3 vs. 4
Saturday, April 10, 10:00

Semifinal
Saturday, April 10th, 16:30

Bronze medal game
Sunday, April 11th, 10:00

Gold medal game
Sunday, April 11th, 16:00

Top five player percentages

References
General

Specific

External links
Official site of tournament

World Men's Curling Championship
Capital One World Men's Curling Championship
Curling
Sport in Cortina d'Ampezzo
April 2010 sports events in Italy
International curling competitions hosted by Italy